The 2015 Macau Open Grand Prix Open was the nineteenth grand prix gold and grand prix tournament of the 2015 BWF Grand Prix Gold and Grand Prix. The tournament was held in Tap Seac Multi-sports Pavilion, Macau November 24–29, 2015 and had a total budget of $120,000.

Men's singles

Seeds

  Srikanth Kidambi (first round)
  Tian Houwei (final)
  Lee Chong Wei (withdrew)
  Son Wan-ho (third round)
  Hu Yun (first round)
  Wei Nan (second round)
  H. S. Prannoy (quarterfinals)
  Xue Song (first round)
  Ajay Jayaram (second round)
  Ng Ka Long (third round)
  Wong Wing Ki (third round)
  Tanongsak Saensomboonsuk (first round)
  Jeon Hyeok-jin (champion)
  Chong Wei Feng (second round)
  B. Sai Praneeth (quarterfinals)
  Ihsan Maulana Mustofa (semifinals)

Finals

Top half

Section 1

Section 2

Section 3

Section 4

Bottom half

Section 5

Section 6

Section 7

Section 8

Women's singles

Seeds

  Ratchanok Intanon (withdrew)
  Akane Yamaguchi (semifinals)
  Sun Yu (first round)
  Bae Yeon-ju (quarterfinals)
  Pusarla Venkata Sindhu (champion)
  Minatsu Mitani (final)
  Yui Hashimoto (quarterfinals)
  Sayaka Sato (quarterfinals)

Finals

Top half

Section 1

Section 2

Bottom half

Section 3

Section 4

Men's doubles

Seeds

  Liu Xiaolong / Qiu Zihan (first round)
  Ko Sung-hyun / Shin Baek-cheol (champion)
  Kim Gi-jung / Kim Sa-rang (quarterfinals)
  Vladimir Ivanov / Ivan Sozonov (semifinals)
  Li Junhui / Liu Yuchen (quarterfinals)
  Wahyu Nayaka / Ade Yusuf (first round)
  Markus Fernaldi Gideon / Kevin Sanjaya Sukamuljo (second round)
  Chen Hung-ling / Wang Chi-lin (semifinals)

Finals

Top half

Section 1

Section 2

Bottom half

Section 3

Section 4

Women's doubles

Seeds

  Reika Kakiiwa / Miyuki Maeda (withdrew)
  Jwala Gutta / Ashwini Ponnappa (first round)
  Naoko Fukuman / Kurumi Yonao (second round)
  Shizuka Matsuo / Mami Naito (semifinals)
  Chang Ye-na / Lee So-hee (quarterfinals)
  Jung Kyung-eun / Shin Seung-chan (champion)
  Go Ah-ra / Yoo Hae-won (quarterfinals)
  Chae Yoo-jung / Kim So-yeong (quarterfinals)

Finals

Top half

Section 1

Section 2

Bottom half

Section 3

Section 4

Mixed doubles

Seeds

  Ko Sung-hyun / Kim Ha-na (withdrew)
  Chris Adcock / Gabrielle Adcock (withdrew)
  Lee Chun Hei / Chau Hoi Wah (quarterfinals)
  Edi Subaktiar / Gloria Emanuelle Widjaja (quarterfinals)
  Shin Baek-cheol / Chae Yoo-jung (champion)
  Chan Yun Lung / Tse Ying Suet (quarterfinals)
  Ronald Alexander / Melati Daeva Oktaviani (semifinals)
  Markis Kido / Pia Zebadiah Bernadeth (first round)

Finals

Top half

Section 1

Section 2

Bottom half

Section 3

Section 4

References

Macau Open Badminton Championships
Macau Open
Macau Open